KOACH (from the Hebrew word "כוח", meaning "strength") was the campus student organization for Conservative Judaism on many college and university campuses and in many Hillels in the United States and abroad. KOACH was a project of the United Synagogue of Conservative Judaism. KOACH's director was Rabbi Elyse Winick. It was discontinued in 2013, due to financial difficulties.

In June 2013 Koach was placed on an indefinite hiatus by its parent organization, the United Synagogue of Conservative Judaism. Within days of the USCJ's announcement a grassroots organization was formed, called MASORTI on Campus.

See also
 Nativ College Leadership Program in Israel
 United Synagogue of Conservative Judaism
 United Synagogue Youth
 KESHER, the college outreach arm of Reform Judaism
 KEDMA, the college outreach arm of Orthodox Judaism
 MASORTI on Campus is the grassroots organization filling Koach's void

References

External links
KOACH
MASORTI on Campus

Student religious organizations in the United States